Lianos may refer to:

Elias Lianos, Greek businessman
Gandini Lianos, horse

See also
Liano (disambiguation)
Liaño (disambiguation)